Dennis Curatolo (born 3 April 2004) is an Italian professional footballer who plays as a centre-forward for Serie A club Inter Milan.

Club career 
Born in Como, Lombardy, Dennis Curatolo played all his youth football at Inter Milan.

During his time in Inter's Academy, he proved to be a prolific goalscorer for the youth teams, with a total of 47 goals from the under-13s to the under-18s by March 2022, most notably during the Torneo di Viareggio.

Early 2022, as his good form in the  had already warranted him a step-up to the Primavera, he was first called by Simone Inzaghi to the first team, as he appeared on the bench during a 2–1 Serie A victory to Lazio in January, and in the following Milan derby, however not making his debut on either occasions.

The following season, as he had scored his first European goal in the Youth League, he was again called to the first team by Inzaghi, as both strikers Lukaku and Correa where injured. Curatolo appeared on the bench again, without coming of it, for the Serie A game against Sassuolo and the Champions League 3–3 draw to Barcelona, that virtually kicked the Spanish giants out of the competition.

References

External links

2004 births
Living people
Italian footballers
Association football forwards
Inter Milan players
Sportspeople from Como